KLTG (96.5 FM, The Beach 96.5) is a radio station broadcasting an adult top 40 music format. Licensed to Corpus Christi, Texas, United States, the station serves the Corpus Christi area.  The station is currently owned by Starlite Broadcasting.  Its studios are located in the Six Points district south of downtown Corpus Christi and the transmitter is in Sinton, Texas. It first aired on September 1, 1967 as KIOU.

References

External links
 
 

Adult top 40 radio stations in the United States
LTG